Asuridia subcruciata is a moth of the family Erebidae first described by Walter Rothschild in 1913. The type location is Little Kei Island.

References

External links
Original description: Novitates Zoologicae. 20: 214.

Nudariina
Moths described in 1913